"Brand New Me", also A Brand New Me, is a 1969 song performed by Dusty Springfield written by Kenneth Gamble, Thom Bell and Jerry Butler. The single reached a peak position of 24 on the Billboard top 100 chart.

Background
Billboard described the single as "a potent rhythm item that should quickly bring her back to the 'Windmills of Your Mind' selling bag." and also praised the song's arrangement.

Charts

Cover versions
It was covered by Aretha Franklin.

References

1969 singles
Dusty Springfield songs
Aretha Franklin songs
1969 songs
Songs written by Kenny Gamble
Songs written by Jerry Butler
Songs written by Thom Bell